See You in Time is a 2017 Taiwanese television series created and produced by SETTV. It stars Hans Chung, Mini Tsai, Esther Huang and David Chiu as the main cast. Filming began on 23 September 2017 and ended in 20 March 2018. It was first broadcast on 10 December 2017 on TTV and airs every Sunday night from 10pm to 11.30pm.

Cast

Main cast
 Hans Chung as Feng Ying
 Zhan Kai Yu (詹鎧聿) as childhood Feng Ying
 Mini Tsai as Ji Zi Qi
 Esther Huang as Song Wei Wei
 Zhuang Qing Qing (莊晴晴) as childhood Wei Wei
 David Chiu as Feng Xing Yu
 Chen Yu Xiang (陳羽翔) as childhood Xing Yu

Supporting cast
 Johnny Yang as Han Sen
 Kuan Lin as Zhong Xiao Long
 Ray Yang as Zhou Li Bao
 Liu Yu Shan as Tang Yu Zhen
 Wen Chung Huang  as Aster pro cycling team member, climber/domestique
 Onion as himself, a stray Shiba Inu
 Chou Zhi Ming as himself, cycling commentator from Hong Kong, and former Hong Kong cycling team coach, also the stunt and cycling co-ordinator of the drama
 Chen Chien-an as himself

Soundtrack
 咖哩番薯 by Gary Chaw
 The Lost Name 你的名字 by Nine Chen
 Power Clerk 心動店員 by Nine Chen
 Messages Seen 有去無回 by Nine Chen feat. Men Envy Children
 就是我 by Gary Chaw
 愛上你 by Chen Wei Ting (陳葦廷)
 已讀不回的愛情 by Chen Wei Ting (陳葦廷)
 Maybe You Don't Understand 也許你不懂 by Astro Bunny
 Neon 霓虹 by Astro Bunny
 I Don't Want to Change the World 我不想改變世界 我只想不被世界改變 by 831
 Beedong 壁咚 by Mini Tsai

Broadcast

Ratings

References

External links
 See You in Time TTV Official Website 
 See You in Time SETTV Official Website 
 

2017 Taiwanese television series debuts
2018 Taiwanese television series endings
Taiwan Television original programming
Sanlih E-Television original programming
Taiwanese drama television series
Taiwanese romance television series
Works about mobile phones
Cycling television series
2010s science fiction television series